Ciro Redondo Municipal Museum is a museum located in Ciro Redondo, Cuba. It was established on 11 February 1983.

The museum holds collections on history, decorative arts, weaponry, archeology and numismatics.

See also 
 List of museums in Cuba

References 

Museums in Cuba
Buildings and structures in Ciego de Ávila Province
Museums established in 1983
1983 establishments in Cuba
20th-century architecture in Cuba